Discography for jazz double-bassist and cellist Ray Brown.

Discography

As leader/co-leader 
 New Sounds in Modern Music (Savoy, 1946)
 Bass Hit! (Verve, 1957) – rec. 1956
 This Is Ray Brown (Polygram, 1958)
 Jazz Cello (Verve, 1960)
 Ray Brown with the All-Star Big Band (Verve, 1962)
 Much in Common with Milt Jackson (Polygram, 1962)
 Ray Brown / Milt Jackson (Verve, 1965)
 This One's for Blanton! with Duke Ellington (Pablo, 1973) – rec. 1972
 Brown's Bag (Concord Jazz, 1975)
 Overseas Special (Concord Jazz, 1975)
 The Big 3 with Milt Jackson and Joe Pass (Pablo, 1975)
 Herb Ellis and the Ray Brown Sextet, Hot Tracks (Concord Jazz, 1976)
 Jones-Brown-Smith with Hank Jones and Jimmie Smith (Concord Jazz, 1976)
 As Good as It Gets (Concord Jazz, 1977)
 Quadrant with Milt Jackson, Mickey Roker, Joe Pass (Original Jazz Classics, 1977)
 Rockin' in Rhythm with Hank Jones, Jimmie Smith (Concord Jazz, 1977)
 Tasty with Jimmy Rowles, (Concord Jazz, 1978)
 Something for Lester (Contemporary, 1978) – rec. 1977
 Tasty! (Concord Jazz, 1979)
 Live at the Concord Jazz Festival (Concord Jazz, 1979) – live
 All Too Soon: The Duke Ellington Album with Milt Jackson, Mickey Roker, Joe Pass (Pablo, 1980)
 Echoes from West (Atlas, 1981)
 The Ray Brown 3 (Concord Jazz, 1982)
 Milt Jackson - Ray Brown Jam (Pablo, 1982)
 Jackson, Johnson, Brown & Company (Original Jazz Classics, 1983)
 Soular Energy (Concord Jazz, 1984)
 One O'Clock Jump (Verve, 1984)
 Bye Bye Blackbird (Paddle Wheel, 1985)
 Don't Forget the Blues (Concord Jazz, 1985)
 The Red Hot Ray Brown Trio (Concord Jazz, 1987) – rec. 1985
 Breakin' Out with George Shearing, Marvin Smith (Concord Jazz, 1987)
 Two Bass Hits (Capri, 1988)
 Bam Bam Bam (Concord Jazz, 1988)
 Georgia on My Mind (LOB, 1989)
 Listen Here! with Gene Harris Quartet (Concord Jazz, 1989)
 After Hours (Telarc, 1989)
 Uptown (Telarc, 1990)
 Moore Makes 4 (Concord Jazz, 1990)
 Summer Wind: Live at the Loa (Concord Jazz, 1990) – live
 3 Dimensional: The Ray Brown Trio (Concord Jazz, 1991)
 Old Friends (Telarc, 1992)
 Kiri Sidetracks: The Jazz Album (Polygram, 1992)
 Bassface (Telarc, 1993)
 Black Orpheus (Evidence, 1994)
 Don't Get Sassy (Telarc, 1994)
 Some of My Best Friends Are...The Piano Players (Telarc, 1994)
 Seven Steps to Heaven (Telarc, 1995)
 Introducing Kristin Korb with the Ray Brown Trio (Telarc, 1996)
 Some of My Best Friends Are...The Sax Players (Telarc, 1996)
 Live at Scullers (Telarc, 1996) – live
 SuperBass (Telarc, 1997)
 Some of My Best Friends Are...Singers (Telarc, 1998)
 Triple Play (Telarc, 1998)
 Summertime (Ray Brown Trio, Ulf Wakenius) (Telarc, 1998)
 Moonlight in Vermont (Prevue, 1998)
 Christmas Songs with The Ray Brown Trio (Telarc, 1999)
 Some of My Best Friends Are... The Trumpet Players (Telarc, 2000)
 Blues for Jazzo (Prevue, 2000)
 The Duo Sessions with Jimmy Rowles (Concord Jazz, 2000)
 Live at Starbucks (Telarc, 2001) – live
 SuperBass 2 (Telarc, 2001)
 Herb Ellis/Ray Brown Sextet, In the Pocket  (Concord Jazz, 2002)
 Some of My Best Friends Are ... Guitarists (Telarc, 2002)
 Triple Scoop (Concord Jazz, 2002)
 Ray Brown Monty Alexander Russell Malone (Telarc, 2002)[2CD]
 Straight Ahead with Monty Alexander, Herb Ellis (Concord Jazz, 2003)
 Walk On (Telarc, 2003)
 As Good as It Gets (Concord Jazz, 2000)
 Live from New York to Tokyo (Concord Jazz, 2003) – live

Compilation
 Bassics: Best of Ray Brown Trio 1977-2000 (Concord Jazz, 2006) –  remastered

As sideman 
With Benny Carter
 Benny Carter Plays Pretty (Norgran, 1954)
 New Jazz Sounds (Norgran, 1954)
 Alone Together (Norgran, 1955) – rec. 1952
 Cosmopolite (Norgran, 1955) – rec. 1952
 Elegy in Blue (MusicMasters, 1994)

With Blossom Dearie
 Blossom Dearie (Verve, 1957)
 Give Him the Ooh-La-La (Verve, 1957)
 Once Upon a Summertime (Verve, 1958)
 Blossom Dearie Sings Comden and Green (Verve, 1959)
 My Gentleman Friend (Verve, 1959)

With Roy Eldridge
 Rockin' Chair (Clef, 1953)
 Dale's Wail (Clef, 1953)
 Little Jazz (Clef, 1954)

With Ella Fitzgerald and Louis Armstrong
 Ella and Louis (Verve, 1956)
 Ella and Louis Again (Verve, 1957)

With José Feliciano
 Feliciano! (RCA Victor, 1968)
 Souled (RCA Victor, 1968)
 10 to 23 (RCA Victor, 1969)

With Dizzy Gillespie
 The Complete RCA Victor Recordings (Bluebird, 1995) – rec. 1937–49
 Diz and Getz (Norgran, 1953)
 Roy and Diz (Clef, 1954)
 For Musicians Only (Verve, 1956)
 Dizzy Gillespie's Big 4 (Pablo, 1974)
 Dizzy Gillespie Jam (Pablo, 1977)

With Coleman Hawkins
 Coleman Hawkins and Confrères (Verve, 1958)
 The High and Mighty Hawk (Felsted, 1958)

With Milt Jackson
 That's the Way It Is (Impulse!, 1969)
 Just the Way It Had to Be (Impulse!, 1969)
 Memphis Jackson (Impulse!, 1969)
Feelings (Pablo, 1976)

With Hank Jones
 Urbanity (Clef, 1956) – rec. 1947–53
 Just for Fun (Galaxy, 1977)

With Quincy Jones
 In the Heat of the Night OST (United Artists, 1967)
 The Lost Man (soundtrack) (Uni, 1969)
 The Hot Rock (soundtrack) (Prophesy, 1972)

With Barney Kessel
 The Poll Winners with Shelly Manne (Contemporary, 1957)
 The Poll Winners Ride Again! (Contemporary, 1958)
 Poll Winners Three! (Contemporary, 1959)
 Exploring the Scene! (Contemporary, 1960)
 Straight Ahead (Contemporary, 1975)
 Soaring (Concord Jazz, 1977)

With Gene Krupa and Buddy Rich
 Krupa and Rich (Verve, 1956)
 The Drum Battle (Verve, 1960) – rec. 1952

With The L.A. Four
 The L.A. Four Scores! (1975, Concord Jazz)
 The L.A.4 (1976, Concord Jazz) –  also issued as Concierto de Aranjuez
 Pavane pour une infante défunte (Nautilus, 1976)
 Just Friends (Concord Jazz, 1978)
 Watch What Happens (Concord Jazz, 1978)
 Going Home (East Wind, 1978)
 Live at Montreux, 1978 (Concord Jazz, 1978)
 Zaca (Concord Jazz, 1980)
 Montage (Concord Jazz, 1981)
 Executive Suite (Concord Jazz, 1982)

With Howard McGhee
 Howard McGhee and Milt Jackson (Savoy, 1955) – rec. 1948
 Together Again!!!! with Teddy Edwards (Contemporary, 1961)

With James Morrison
 Snappy Doo (East West, 1991)
 Two the Max (East West, 1992)

With Maria Muldaur
 Maria Muldaur (Reprise, 1973)
 Waitress in a Donut Shop (Reprise, 1974)

With Phineas Newborn, Jr.
 Please Send Me Someone to Love (Contemporary, 1969)
 Harlem Blues (Contemporary, 1975) – rec. 1969
 Look Out – Phineas Is Back! (Pablo, 1978) – rec. 1976
 Back Home (Contemporary, 1985) – rec. 1976

With Oscar Peterson
 Lester Young with the Oscar Peterson Trio (Clef, 1952)
 The Astaire Story (Clef, 1952)
 Oscar Peterson Plays Duke Ellington (Clef, 1952)
 Buddy DeFranco and Oscar Peterson Play George Gershwin (Clef, 1954)
 Oscar Peterson Plays Harold Arlen (Clef, 1954)
 Oscar Peterson Plays Count Basie (Clef, 1955)
 Toni (Verve, 1956)
 Ellis in Wonderland (Verve, 1956)
 Oscar Peterson at the Stratford Shakespearean Festival (Verve, 1956)
 Anita Sings the Most (Verve, 1956)
 Soft Sands (Verve, 1957)
 The Oscar Peterson Trio with Sonny Stitt, Roy Eldridge and Jo Jones at Newport (Verve, 1957)
 Jazz Giants '58 (Verve, 1957)
 Stan Getz and the Oscar Peterson Trio (Verve, 1957)
 Only the Blues (Verve, 1957) with Sonny Stitt
 Louis Armstrong Meets Oscar Peterson (Verve, 1957)
 Soulville with Ben Webster (Verve, 1957)
 The Genius of Coleman Hawkins (Verve, 1957)
 Coleman Hawkins Encounters Ben Webster (Verve, 1957)
 Stan Getz and J.J. Johnson at the Opera House (Verve, 1957)
 Oscar Peterson at the Concertgebouw (Verve, 1958)
 Ella in Rome: The Birthday Concert (Verve, 1958)
 On the Town with the Oscar Peterson Trio (Verve, 1958)
 Oscar Peterson Plays "My Fair Lady" (Verve, 1958)
 Sonny Stitt Sits in with the Oscar Peterson Trio (Verve, 1959)
 A Jazz Portrait of Frank Sinatra (Verve, 1959)
 The Jazz Soul of Oscar Peterson (Verve, 1959)
 Oscar Peterson Plays the Duke Ellington Songbook (Verve, 1959)
 Oscar Peterson Plays the George Gershwin Songbook (Verve, 1959)
 Oscar Peterson Plays the Richard Rodgers Songbook (Verve, 1959)
 Oscar Peterson Plays the Jerome Kern Songbook (Verve, 1959)
 Oscar Peterson Plays the Cole Porter Songbook (Verve, 1959)
 Oscar Peterson Plays the Harold Arlen Songbook (Verve, 1959)
 Oscar Peterson Plays Porgy & Bess (Verve, 1959)
 Swinging Brass with the Oscar Peterson Trio (Verve, 1959)
 Ben Webster Meets Oscar Peterson (Verve, 1959)
 Fiorello! (Verve, 1960)
 The Trio (Verve, 1961)
 The Sound of the Trio (Verve, 1961)
 West Side Story (Verve, 1962)
 Bursting Out with the All-Star Big Band! (Verve, 1962)
 Affinity (Verve, 1962)
 Something Warm (Verve, 1962)
 Put On a Happy Face (Verve, 1962)
 Very Tall (Verve, 1962)
 Night Train (Verve, 1962)
 Bill Henderson with the Oscar Peterson Trio (Verve, 1963)
 The Oscar Peterson Trio Plays (Verve, 1964)
 Oscar Peterson Trio + One (Verve, 1964)
 Canadiana Suite (Limelight, 1964)
 We Get Requests (Verve, 1964)
 I/We Had a Ball (Limelight, 1965) - 1 track
 Eloquence (Limelight, 1965)
 With Respect to Nat (Limelight, 1965)
 Blues Etude (Limelight, 1965)
 Action (MPS, 1964)
 Girl Talk (MPS, 1968) – rec. 1965–68
 Reunion Blues with Milt Jackson (MPS, 1971)
 The History of an Artist, Vol. 1 (Pablo, 1972)
 The History of an Artist, Vol. 2 (Pablo, 1972)
 Satch and Josh (Pablo, 1974) with Count Basie
 The Giants (Pablo, 1974)
 The Giants, Oscar Peterson, Joe Pass, (Original Jazz Classics, 1974)
 Ella and Oscar (Pablo, 1975)
 Happy Time (Pablo, 1975) with Roy Eldridge
 Oscar Peterson and the Bassists – Montreux '77 (Pablo, 1977)
 Eddie "Lockjaw" Davis 4 – Montreux '77 (Pablo, 1977)
 How Long Has This Been Going On? Sarah Vaughan (Pablo, 1978)
 The Trumpet Summit Meets the Oscar Peterson Big 4 (Pablo, 1980) (Dizzy Gillespie, Freddie Hubbard, Clark Terry)
 The Alternate Blues (Pablo, 1980), Dizzy Gillespie, Freddie Hubbard, Clark Terry
 Ain't But a Few of Us Left (Palbo, 1981) Milt Jackson, Ray Brown, Grady Tate
 Live at the Blue Note (Telarc, 1990)
 Saturday Night at the Blue Note (Telarc, 1990)
 Last Call at the Blue Note (Telarc, 1990)
 Encore at the Blue Note (Telarc, 1990)
 Side by Side (Telarc, 1994)
 The More I See You, Benny Carter, Clark Terry (Telarc, 1995)
 Exclusively for My Friends: The Lost Tapes (MPS, 1995) – rec. 1965–68
 A Tribute to Oscar Peterson – Live at the Town Hall (Telarc, 1997)
 Oscar and Benny (Telarc, 1998)

With André Previn
 After Hours (Telarc, 1989)
 Uptown (Telarc, 1990)
 Old Friends (Telarc, 1992)
 What Headphones? (Angel, 1993)
 André Previn and Friends Play Show Boat (Deutsche Grammophon, 1995)

With Linda Ronstadt
 What's New (Asylum, 1983)
 For Sentimental Reasons (Asylum, 1986)

With Lalo Schifrin
 Music from Mission: Impossible (Dot, 1967)
 There's a Whole Lalo Schifrin Goin' On (Dot, 1968)
 More Mission: Impossible (Paramount, 1968)
 Bullitt (soundtrack) (Warner Bros., 1968)
 Kelly's Heroes (MGM, 1970)
 Jazz Meets the Symphony (Atlantic, 1992)
 More Jazz Meets the Symphony (Atlantic, 1993)
 Firebird: Jazz Meets the Symphony No. 3 (Four Winds, 1995)
 Metamorphosis: Jazz Meets the Symphony #4 (Aleph, 1998)

With Bud Shank
 Bud Shank & the Sax Section (Pacific Jazz, 1966)
 Bud Shank Plays Music from Today's Movies (World Pacific, 1967)
 Windmills of Your Mind (Pacific Jazz, 1969)

With The Manhattan Transfer
 Vocalese (Atlantic, 1985)
 Swing (Atlantic, 1997)

With Sarah Vaughan
 Sarah Vaughan with Michel Legrand (Mainstream, 1972)
 How Long Has This Been Going On? (Pablo, 1978)

With Ben Webster
 King of the Tenors (Verve, 1954)
 Music for Loving (Norgran, 1954)
 Coleman Hawkins Encounters Ben Webster (Verve, 1957)
 Ben Webster and Associates (Verve, 1959)

With Joe Williams
 With Love (Temponic, 1972)
 Nothin' but the Blues (Delos, 1983)

With others
 Count Basie, Basie Jazz (Clef, 1954) – rec. 1952
 Louis Bellson, Drummer's Holiday (Verve, 1958)
 Marc Benno, Ambush (A&M, 1972)
 Stephen Bishop, Bish (ABC, 1978)
 Blondie, Autoamerican (Chrysalis, 1980)
 Dee Dee Bridgewater, Dear Ella (Verve, 1997)
 Till Brönner, Generations of Jazz (Minor Music, 1994)
 Natalie Cole, Unforgettable... with Love (Elektra, 1991)
 Priscilla Coolidge, Gypsy Queen (Sussex, 1970)
 Elvis Costello, King of America (F-Beat, 1986)
 Harry Edison, Gee Baby, Ain't I Good to You (Verve, 1957)
 Teddy Edwards, Feelin's (Muse, 1974)
 Duke Ellington, Duke's Big 4 (Pablo, 1973)
 Don Ellis, Haiku (MPS, 1974)
 Art Farmer, On the Road (Contemporary, 1976)
 Maynard Ferguson, Around the Horn with Maynard Ferguson (EmArcy, 1956)
 Ella Fitzgerald, These Are the Blues (Verve, 1963)
 Aretha Franklin, Sweet Passion (Atlantic, 1977)
 Ted Gärdestad, Blue Virgin Isles (Polar, 1978)
 Jimmy Giuffre, The Easy Way (Verve, 1959)
 Hampton Hawes, Hampton Hawes at the Piano (Contemporary, 1978) – rec. 1976
 Johnny Hodges, The Blues (Norgran, 1955) – rec. 1952–54
 Illinois Jacquet, Swing's the Thing (Clef, 1956)
 Elton John, Duets (Rocket, 1993)
 J. J. Johnson, Concepts in Blue (Pablo Today, 1981)
 Quincy Jones, Walking in Space (A&M, 1969)
 Diana Krall, Only Trust Your Heart (GRP, 1995)
 Peggy Lee, Mirrors (A&M, 1975)
 Nick Lowe, Party of One (Reprise, 1990)
 Junior Mance, Junior (Verve, 1959)
 Barry Manilow, Manilow Sings Sinatra (Arista, 1998)
 Frank Morgan, Love, Lost & Found (Telarc, 1995)
 Gerry Mulligan and Stan Getz, Gerry Mulligan Meets Stan Getz (Verve, 1957)
 Oliver Nelson, Sound Pieces (Impulse!, 1966)
 Charlie Parker, Big Band (Clef, 1954)
 Art Pepper and Zoot Sims, Art 'n' Zoot (Pablo, 1995) – rec. 1981
 André Previn and Kiri Te Kanawa, Kiri Sidetracks: The Jazz Album (Polygram, 1992)
 Della Reese, On Strings of Blue (ABC, 1967)
 Buddy Rich, The Wailing Buddy Rich (Norgran, 1955)
 Lionel Richie, Lionel Richie (Motown, 1982)
 Red Rodney, Superbop (Muse, 1974)
 Sonny Rollins and Shelly Manne Way Out West (Contemporary, 1957)
 Frank Sinatra, L.A. Is My Lady (Qwest, 1984)
 Steely Dan, Countdown to Ecstasy (ABC, 1973)
 Clark Terry, Memories of Duke (Pablo Today, 1980)
 Jack Wilson, Something Personal (Blue Note, 1966)
 Lester Young and Harry Edison, Pres and Sweets (Norgran, 1955)
 V.A., Jazz: Live from New York (Telarc, 2001)

Jazz discographies
 
Discographies of American artists